The 2019–20 season was the second consecutive campaign for Aris in the Super League 1 after its return to the top division of Greece. The club also competed in the Greek Cup and the UEFA Europa League.

Aris were eliminated in the third qualifying round of the UEFA Europa League by the Norwegian Molde FK.

First-team squad

Transfers and Loans

Transfers In

Transfers Out

Loans In

Transfer summary

Spending

Summer:  790.000 €

Winter:  0 €

Total:  790.000 €

Income

Summer:  500.000 €

Winter:  0 €

Total:  500.000 €

Net Expenditure

Summer:  290.000 €

Winter:  0 €

Total:  290.000 €

Competitions

Overall

Overview

{| class="wikitable" style="text-align: center"
|-
!rowspan=2|Competition
!colspan=8|Record
|-
!
!
!
!
!
!
!
!
|-
| Super League 1

|-
| Greek Cup

|-
| UEFA Europa League

|-
! Total

{| class="wikitable" style="text-align: center"
|-
!rowspan=2|Super League 1
!colspan=8|Record
|-
!
!
!
!
!
!
!
!
|-
| Regular Season

|-
| Championship Round

|-
! Total

Managers' Overview

{| class="wikitable" style="text-align: center"
|-
!rowspan=2|Manager
!rowspan=2|Nat.
!rowspan=2|From
!rowspan=2|Until
!colspan=8|Record
|-
!
!
!
!
!
!
!
!
|-
| Savvas Pantelidis
| 
| Start of Season
| 31 August 2019

|-
| Apostolos Terzis
| 
| 2 September 2019
| 11 October 2019

|-
| Michael Oenning
| 
| 12 October 2019
| End of Season

|-

Super League 1

Regular season

League table

Results summary

Results by matchday

Championship Round

League table
</onlyinclude>

</onlyinclude>

Results summary

Results by matchday

Matches

Regular season

Play-off Round

Greek Cup 

Aris Thessaloniki entered the competition in the Round of 16 because it finished 5th in the previous season of the Super League. The final five clubs of the last Super League are introduced to the tournament in the Round of 16 and they are seeded in the draw. In the draws for the quarter-finals onwards, there are no seedings.

Round of 16

Quarter-finals

Semi-finals

UEFA Europa League 

Aris Thessaloniki finished 5th in the 2018–19 Super League Greece and entered the competition in the Second qualifying round.

Second Qualifying Round

Third Qualifying Round

Squad statistics

Appearances

Goals

Clean sheets

Players' awards

NIVEA MEN Best Goal (Super League 1)

NIVEA MEN Player of the Month (Super League 1)

NIVEA MEN Player of the Club

References

2019–20
Aris Thessaloniki F.C. season